Steven P. Neville (born June 30, 1950 in Santa Fe, New Mexico) is an American politician and a Republican member of the New Mexico Senate representing District 2 since January 2005.

Education
Neville earned his BS in agronomy and genetics and his MS in agricultural economics and animal science from New Mexico State University.

Elections
2012 Neville was unopposed for both the June 5, 2012 Republican Primary, winning with 2,988 votes and the November 6, 2012 General election, winning with 14,168 votes.
2004 When District 2 Republican Senator Raymond Kysar left the Legislature and left the seat open, Neville was unopposed for both the June 1, 2004 Republican Primary, winning with 1,878 votes and the November 2, 2004 General election, winning with 14,084 votes.
2008 Neville was unopposed for both the June 8, 2008 Republican Primary, winning with 2,857 votes and the November 4, 2008 General election, winning with 14,223 votes.

References

External links
Official page at the New Mexico Legislature
Campaign site

Steven Neville at Ballotpedia
Steven P. Neville at the National Institute on Money in State Politics

1950 births
Living people
Republican Party New Mexico state senators
New Mexico State University alumni
People from Aztec, New Mexico
Politicians from Santa Fe, New Mexico
21st-century American politicians